Juncus validus, the roundhead rush, is a species of flowering plant in the family Juncaceae, native to the central and southeastern United States. It is a somewhat weedy species, found along wet roadsides and in ditches.

References

validus
Endemic flora of the United States
Flora of the Southeastern United States
Flora of Illinois
Flora of Kansas
Flora of Missouri
Flora of Oklahoma
Flora of Texas
Plants described in 1895
Flora without expected TNC conservation status